The 1972 European Wrestling Championships  was held from 24  to 30 May 1972 in Katowice, Poland.

Medal table

Medal summary

Men's freestyle

Men's Greco-Roman

References

External links
Fila's official championship website

Europe
W
European Wrestling Championships
Sports competitions in Katowice
1972 in European sport